Erbessa albilinea is a moth of the family Notodontidae first described by James S. Miller in 2008. It is found in Costa Rica.

The length of the forewings is 18.5–21 mm for males and 21–23 mm for females. The ground color of the forewings is blackish brown. The veins, especially in the basal half, are slightly lighter. The hindwings have a brilliant, iridescent aquamarine to turquoise-blue area, this area becomes darker cobalt blue at its lateral margin. The outer margin of the wing is blackish brown.

The larvae feed on Miconia dolichopoda and Conostegia subcrustulata. They have a contrasting tiger-stripe pattern, running over almost the entire length of the body.

References

Moths described in 2008
Notodontidae